Sejong Institute (Korean: 세종연구소, Hanja: 世宗硏究所) is a non-profit, independent organization for public interest and a think tank in South Korea, dedicated to developing strategies and policies in areas of foreign and security affairs and Korean unification, regional issues, and international political economy. The Sejong Institute was established as a foundation for policy studies and research with the support of national leaders in politics and business, in the aftermath of the Rangoon Incident in October 1983. The institute's current president, Haksoon Paik (백학순), Ph.D. in Political Science at the University of Pennsylvania, is a Korean expert in North Korean politics, inter-Korean relations, North Korea-U.S. relations, and North Korean nuclear and missile issues. The Sejong Institute works in collaboration with international specialists and institutions holding various academic conferences and forums around the world. It provides policy ideas and strategies for peace and prosperity for Korea and the world, and plays a role to strengthen Korea's public diplomacy.

Research
The Sejong Institute operates three research departments – Department of Diplomatic Strategy Studies, Department of Security Strategy Studies, and Department of Unification Strategy Studies.

Education
The Sejong Institute carries out an annual training program called the Sejong National Strategy Education Program. It lasts around 10 months and receives leaders from government agencies, government invested organizations and private sector. The trainees attend lectures from invited lecturers as well as research fellows of the Sejong Institute. Also, the institute has begun to offer the program Academy for Young Leaders for undergraduate and graduate students to cultivate young leaders of the next generation in the areas of diplomacy, security, and national unification.

Publications
The books and journals they publish include joint and individual Mid-to-Long-Term Policy Research, Comprehensive Research, Granted Research Projects, quarterly National Strategy, and a web-based email service in the form of Sejong Commentary, Current Issues & Policies, and Sejong Policy Brief. The Sejong as an institution produces an Annual Report as well, which details an updated introduction of the institute and summarizes the annual research outcomes.

Support programs for bereaved families
The Sejong Foundation is providing financial support and scholarship to the bereaved families of the 1983 Rangoon bombing victims — 17 senior diplomatic officials and other members of the presidential entourage – killed by North Korean terrorists.

History
The history of the Sejong Institute is presented in the following timeline:

References 

Think tanks based in South Korea
Think tanks established in 1983
1986 establishments in South Korea
Sejong the Great